Raúl Ernesto Ruiz Pino (25 July 1941 – 19 August 2011) was an experimental Chilean filmmaker, writer and teacher whose work is best known in France. He directed more than 100 films.

Biography
The son of a ship's captain and a schoolteacher in southern Chile, Raúl Ruiz abandoned his university studies in theology and law to write 100 plays with the support of a Rockefeller Foundation grant. He went on to learn his craft working in Chilean and Mexican television and studying at film school in Argentina (1964). Back in Chile, he made his feature debut Three Sad Tigers (1968), sharing the Golden Leopard at the 1969 Locarno Film Festival. According to Ruiz in a 1991 interview, Three Sad Tigers "is a film without a story, it is the reverse of a story. Somebody kills somebody. All the elements of a story are there but they are used like a landscape, and the landscape is used like story." He was something of an outsider among the politically oriented Chilean filmmakers of his generation such as Miguel Littín and Patricio Guzmán, his work being far more ironic, surrealistic and experimental. In 1973, shortly after the military coup d'état led by Augusto Pinochet, Ruiz and his wife (fellow director Valeria Sarmiento) fled Chile and settled in Paris, France.

Ruiz soon developed a reputation among European critics and cinephiles as an avant-garde film magician, writing and directing a remarkable number of amusing, eccentric, complex, and highly literary low-to-no-budget films in the 1970s and 1980s (often for France's Institut national de l'audiovisuel and then for Portuguese producer Paulo Branco). The best known of these often oneiric, fabulist films are: Colloque de chiens (1977), a short which marked the start of Ruiz's long-term working relationship with Chilean composer Jorge Arriagada; The Suspended Vocation (1978); The Hypothesis of the Stolen Painting (1978); On Top of the Whale (1982); Three Crowns of the Sailor (1983); City of Pirates (1983); Manoel's Destinies (1985); Treasure Island (1985) and Life is a Dream (1986). A special issue of Cahiers du cinéma was devoted to Ruiz in March 1983.

In the 1990s, Ruiz began working with larger budgets and "name" stars like John Hurt in Dark at Noon (1992) and Marcello Mastroianni in Three Lives and Only One Death (1996). The following year, he made Genealogies of a Crime starring Catherine Deneuve, winning the Silver Bear at the 47th Berlin International Film Festival. A second major French actress, Isabelle Huppert, worked with Ruiz on Comedy of Innocence (2000), which was nominated for the Golden Lion at the Venice Film Festival. The American John Malkovich acted in the star-studded Marcel Proust adaptation Time Regained (1999) and the somewhat less successful Savage Souls (2001) and Klimt (2006). That Day (2003) was the fourth and last Ruiz film to be shown in the main competition of the Cannes Film festival. He also made forays into the English-language mainstream with the thrillers Shattered Image (1998) and A Closed Book (2010). In the final decade of his life, Ruiz wrote and directed several low-budget productions in his native Chile, but his final international success was the Franco-Portuguese epic Mysteries of Lisbon (2010).

Ruiz claimed that he was "always trying to make this connection between different ways of producing: film, theater, installations, and videos" – he hoped his "films would have to be seen many times, like objects in the house, like a painting. They have to have a minimum of complexity." Over the years, he taught his own particular brand of film theory, which he explained in his two books Poetics of Cinema 1: Miscellanies (1995) and Poetics of Cinema 2 (2007), and actively engaged in film and video projects with university and film school students in many countries, including the US, France, Colombia, Chile, Italy and Scotland.

Ruiz died in August 2011 as a result of complications from a lung infection, having successfully undergone a liver transplant in early 2010 after being diagnosed with a life-threatening tumour. The Presidents of France and Chile both praised him. The Church of Saint George-Paul in Paris held a memorial service which was attended by many notable friends, including Catherine Deneuve, Chiara Mastroianni, Melvil Poupaud, Paulo Branco, Arielle Dombasle, Michel Piccoli and Jorge Edwards. Ruiz's body was then returned to Chile to be buried as specified in his will and a National Day of Mourning was declared in Chile.

Legacy

Ruiz's final completed feature Night Across the Street (2012) was selected to be screened posthumously in the Directors' Fortnight section of the 2012 Cannes Film Festival. His widow Valeria Sarmiento, who was also his collaborator and frequent editor for several decades, completed Lines of Wellington (2012), the Napoleonic epic that Ruiz was preparing when he died and the film was in competition for the Golden Lion at the 69th Venice International Film Festival and as a Zabaltegi Special at the 2012 San Sebastián International Film Festival. Both films were also shown at the 2012 Toronto International Film Festival and the 2012 New York Film Festival.

On 25 July 2014, Serpentine Galleries in London launched "Pirates and Disappearances: A Homage to Raúl Ruiz", a weekend of Ruiz-related talks and screenings. The most complete retrospective yet of Ruiz's work took place at the Cinémathèque française in Paris between 30 March and 30 May 2016. Another retrospective commemoration was held at Lincoln Center in New York City which ran during the week ending 22 December 2016 with Part 2 in February 2018.

The feature film The Wandering Soap Opera, which Ruiz had shot in Chile in 1990 but left unfinished, was completed by Sarmiento and premiered at the Locarno Film Festival in August 2017. Ruiz's feature debut The Tango of the Widower and its Distorting Mirror, filmed in 1967 but shelved following budgetary problems, was restored by Sarmiento for a February 2020 premiere in the 70th Berlin International Film Festival.

A third Ruiz film, Socialist Realism as One of the Fine Arts, is currently being restored and completed by Sarmiento for an official premiere in 2021. Ruiz was not able to give the film a final edit as a result of the Chilean coup in 1973 and it was presumed lost for many years. A fifty-minute rough cut was shown at the Valdivia International Film Festival in 2008, but four-and-a-half hours of footage was recovered from the archives of Duke University in 2016.

Awards
 Three Sad Tigers tied with three other films for the 1969 Golden Leopard award at the Locarno Film Festival.
 1979 César Award for best plot for a short film, for Colloque de chiens.
 Three Crowns of the Sailor won the Perspectives du Cinéma Award at the Cannes Film Festival (1983).
 Guggenheim Fellowship for Creative Arts-Film (1983).
 Manoel's Destinies won the KNF Award at the Rotterdam International Film Festival (1985).
 Three Lives and Only One Death (1996) won the Critics Award at the São Paulo International Film Festival.
 Genealogies of a Crime (1997) won the Silver Bear at the 47th Berlin International Film Festival.
 Chile's National Prize for Performing and Audiovisual Arts (1997)
 FIPRESCI Prize at the Montréal World Film Festival in 2000 "for brilliantly exploring the range of narrative possibilities of the cinema and celebrating and demonstrating the art of storytelling through the ages" in Love Torn in a Dream.
 At the Montréal World Film Festival (2002), Cofralandes, Chilean Rhapsody won the Glauber Rocha Award for the Best Film from Latin America and a FIPRESCI Prize "for the director's personal exploration into his homeland, using DV in a rigorous yet playful manner".
 Master of Cinema prize at the Mannheim-Heidelberg International Filmfestival (2003).
 Klimt won the Russian Film Clubs Federation Award at the 28th Moscow International Film Festival (2006).
 Master of Cinema prize at the Rome Film Festival (2007).
 Mysteries of Lisbon (2010) won the Silver Shell for Best Director at the San Sebastián International Film Festival, the Louis Delluc Prize for best French film and Critics Award for best film at the São Paulo International Film Festival.
 Posthumous Special Award at the 2011 New York Film Critics Circle Awards.

Filmography

La maleta (1963) – short film lost and completed in 2008
Le retour (1964) – unfinished short film
El tango del viudo y su espejo deformante [The Tango of the Widower and its Distorting Mirror] (1967) – unfinished and restored for a 2020 release
Tres tristes tigres [Three Sad Tigers] (1968)
La catanaria (1969)
Militarismo y tortura (1969) – short film
La colonia penal [The Penal Colony] (1970)
Ahora te vamos a llamar hermano (1971) – short film
Nadie dijo nada (1971)
¡Qué hacer! (1972)
Los minuteros (1972) – short film
Poesía popular: La teoría y la práctica (1972) – short film
Abastecimiento (1973) – short film
Palomita blanca [Little White Dove] (1973)
Realismo socialista como una de las bellas artes [Socialist Realism] (1973) - being restored for a 2021 release
Palomita brava (1973) – short film
La expropiación [The Expropriation] (1974)
Diálogos de exiliados [Dialogues of Exiles] (1975)
Sotelo (1976) – short film
Utopia (1976)
Colloque de chiens (1977) – short film
Les divisions de la nature (1978) – short film
La vocation suspendue [The Suspended Vocation] (1978)
L'hypothèse du tableau volé [The Hypothesis of the Stolen Painting] (1978)
Petit manuel d'histoire de France (1979)
Jeux (1979)
De grands événements et de gens ordinaires [Of Great Events and Ordinary People] (1979)
Images de débat (1979)
Zig-Zag – le jeu de l'oie (une fiction didactique à propos de la cartographie) (1980) – short film
La ville nouvelle (1980) – short film
Fahlstrom (1980) – short film
Musée Dali (1980)
L'image en silence (1980)
Le borgne (1980)
Teletests (1980) – short film
The Territory (1981)
Images de sable (1981) – short film
Ombres chinoises (1982) – short film
Querelle des jardins (1982) – short film
Le petit théâtre (1982) – short film
Het dak van de Walvis [On Top of the Whale] (1982)
Bérénice (1983)
La ville de Paris (1983)
Lettre d'un cinéaste ou Le retour d'un amateur de bibliothèques [Letter from a Library Lover] (1983) – short film
Les trois couronnes du matelot [Three Crowns of the Sailor] (1983)
La ville des pirates [City of Pirates] (1983)
Voyages d'une main (1984)
Point de fuite [Vanishing Point] (1984)
Les destins de Manoel [Manoel's Destinies/Manoel on the Island of Marvels] (1984)
L'Île au trésor [Treasure Island] (1985)
La présence réelle (1985)
Régime sans pain (1985)
L'éveillé du pont de l'Alma [The Insomniac on the Bridge] (1985)
Richard III (1986)
Mémoire des apparences [Life is a Dream] (1986)
Dans un miroir (1986)
Mammame (1986)
Brise-glace (1987)
La chouette aveugle [The Blind Owl] (1987)
Le professeur Taranne (1987)
Allegoria (1988)
Tous les nuages sont des horloges (1988)
Il pozzo dei pazzi (1989) – short film
Derrière le mur (1989)
Hub (1989)
The Golden Boat (1990)
La telenovela errante [The Wandering Soap Opera] (1990) – unfinished feature completed by Sarmiento and released in 2017
A TV Dante (Cantos 9–14) (1991)
Las soledades (1992) – short film
L'oeil qui ment [Dark at Noon] (1992)
Fado majeur et mineur [Fado, Major and Minor] (1994)
Wind Water (1995) – short film
Trois vies et une seule mort [Three Lives and Only One Death] (1996)
Généalogies d'un crime [Genealogies of a Crime] (1997)
Le film à venir (1997) – short film
Shattered Image (1998)
Le temps retrouvé [Time Regained] (1999)
Comédie de l'innocence [Comedy of Innocence] (2000)
Combat d'amour en songe [Love Torn in a Dream] (2000)
Les Âmes fortes [Savage Souls] (2001)
Miotte vu par Raúl Ruiz (2002)
Cofralandes, rapsodia chilena [Cofralandes, Chilean Rhapsody] (2002)
Ce jour-là [That Day] (2003)
Une place parmi les vivants [A Place Among the Living/A Taste for Murder] (2003)
Vertige de la page blanche [Vertigo of the Blank Page] (2003)
Días de campo [Days in the Country] (2004)
Le domaine perdu [The Lost Domain] (2005)
Klimt (2006)
Le Don (2007) – short film
La Recta Provincia (2007)
Litoral (2008)
La maison Nucingen [Nucingen House] (2008)
Agathopedia (2008)
El pasaporte amarillo [The Yellow Passport] (2009)
A Closed Book [Blind Revenge] (2010)
L'estate breve (2010)
Mistérios de Lisboa [Mysteries of Lisbon] (2010)
Ballet aquatique (2011)
La noche de enfrente [Night Across the Street] (2012)

Bibliography
 Translated into Spanish as:  Translated from the French by Cristóbal Santa Cruz.
 Translated into English as: 

 Translated into English as:  Translated from the French by Brian Holmes. Translated into Spanish as:  Translated from the French by Waldo Rojas.

 Translated into English as:  Translated from the Spanish by Carlos Eduardo Morreo.
 Translated into English as:  Translated from the French by Paul Buck and Catherine Petit.
 Translated into English as:  Translated from the French by Paul Buck and Catherine Petit.
 Sections translated from the French by Alan Pauls.
 Selection, editing and prologue by Bruno Cuneo.
 Edited by Bruno Cuneo.
 Translated from the Spanish by Paul Buck and Catherine Petit. Illustrations by Camila Mora Scheihing.

References

External links

MUBI's Ruiz page
Annotated filmography (up to 2005) at Rouge online film magazine
The rubicon and the rubik cube: Exile, paradox and Raúl Ruiz 1981/1982 article by Gilbert Adair
Mapping the Territory of Râúl Ruiz 1987/1990 article by Jonathan Rosenbaum
BOMB interview (1991) by Carole Anne Klonarides 
Sight & Sound interview (2002) by Nick James
Cinema Scope interview (2002) by Jonathan Rosenbaum
Towards a Perverse Neo-Baroque Cinematic Aesthetic 2004 article by Michael Goddard
Vertigo interview (2004) by George Clark
GreenCine interview (2006) by Jonathan Marlow
Vertigo interview (2007) by James Norton
New York Times interview (2011) by A. O. Scott
Time magazine obituary (2011) by Richard Corliss
Sight & Sound obituary (2011) by Jonathan Romney
'A Ghost at Noon' (2011) tribute by Adrian Martin

1941 births
2011 deaths
Burials in Chile
People from Puerto Montt
Film theorists
Chilean film directors
Chilean experimental filmmakers
Chilean emigrants to France
Chilean expatriates in France
Chilean exiles
Chilean socialists
Chilean screenwriters
Male screenwriters
Silver Bear for Best Director recipients
Golden Globes (Portugal) winners
César Award winners